Ava Marie Clements and Leah Rose Clements (born July 7, 2010), known as the Clements twins, are American models and social media personalities who are identical twins. When the twins were seven years old, their parents signed with two modelling agencies.

Several news outlets have referred to them as "the most beautiful twins in the world",  they have more than 1.9 million followers on Instagram.

Personal lives
Ava Marie  and Leah Rose Clements were born on July 7, 2010 to Kevin Clements, a school swim coach, and Jaqi Clements. They have one sibling. They are from Orange County, California.

Kevin was diagnosed with cancer in 2019. The twins used their Instagram account to help raise funds and find a donor for his bone marrow transplant.

Career
Kevin and Jaqi wanted to start the twins in modeling when they were six months old, held off on this the plan due to the amount of time needed to make this commitment, until the twins turned seven. At the time, the Clements' neighbor wanted models to help advertise a newly opened children's boutique. The twins posed for pictures together, and Jaqi sent the images to contacts she had collected from her first attempt to get the twins a modeling career. She met with various modeling agencies, and eventually signed contracts with two agencies: one in Orange County, California and another in Los Angeles. A year after starting their modeling careers, the twins had gained more than half a million followers on Instagram.

References

General references

Inline citations

External links

2010 births
American child models
American identical twin children
Female models from California
Identical twin females
Living people
People from Orange County, California
Sibling duos
Social media influencers